Patan is a Lok Sabha (parliamentary) constituency in Gujarat state in western India.

Vidhan Sabha segments
Presently, Patan Lok Sabha constituency comprises seven Vidhan Sabha (legislative assembly) segments. These are:

Members of Lok Sabha

Election Results

Lok Sabha 2019

General Election 2014

General Elections 2009

Lok Sabha 2004

Lok Sabha 1957 
 Patan was in Bombay State in 1957.
 Thakore, Motisinh Bahadursinh (IND) : 131,802 votes 
 Vijaykumar Madhavlal Trivedi  (INC) : 90,458

See also
 Patan district
 List of Constituencies of the Lok Sabha

Notes

Lok Sabha constituencies in Gujarat
Patan district